Visitors to Antigua and Barbuda must obtain a visa from one of the Antigua and Barbuda diplomatic missions or in certain cases in United Kingdom diplomatic missions unless they come from one of the visa exempt countries.

Cruise ship visitors who would normally require a visa do not require one provided that they arrive in Antigua and Barbuda in the morning and depart the same evening.

Visa policy map

Visa exemption 
Holders of passports of the following 108 countries can visit Antigua and Barbuda without a visa:

Holders of diplomatic or official passports issued to nationals of Haiti do not require a visa.

Holders of a Laissez-Passer issued by the United Nations and the Caribbean Community (CARICOM) traveling on duty do not required a visa.
Serbia and Antigua signed an visa waiver agreement on 11th of march 2023.

Electronic Entry Visa

Visitors from countries that require a visa for Antigua and Barbuda can apply for an Electronic Entry Visa (EEV) online. Biometrics, if required, will be taken on arrival.

COVID-19 pandemic
During the COVID-19 pandemic, entry was not allowed for persons who had previously visited China, Iran, Italy, Japan, South Korea or Singapore.

Visitor statistics
Most visitors arriving to Antigua and Barbuda as tourists are from the following countries of nationality:

See also

 Visa requirements for Antigua and Barbuda citizens

External links
 Countries Exempt from Visa, Department of Immigration - Ministry of Foreign Affairs, International Trade and Immigration.

References 

Antigua and Barbuda
Foreign relations of Antigua and Barbuda